Nothing comes from nothing is a philosophical dictum first argued by Parmenides. It is associated with ancient Greek cosmology, such as is presented not just in the works of Homer and Hesiod, but also in virtually every internal system: there is no break in-between a world that did not exist and one that did, since it could not be created  in the first place.

Parmenides
The idea that "nothing comes from nothing", as articulated by Parmenides, first appears in Aristotle's Physics:

The above, in a translation based on the John Burnet translation, appears as follows:

Lucretius

He then continues on discussing how matter is required to make matter and that objects cannot spring forth without reasonable cause.

Early modern literature
In Shakespeare's play King Lear Act 1 Scene 1, the title character says to his daughter Cordelia, "Nothing can come of nothing".

Modern physics 
The law of conservation of energy states that the total energy of an isolated system cannot change. The zero-energy universe hypothesis states that the amount of energy in the universe minus the amount of gravity is exactly zero. In this kind of universe, matter could be created from nothing through a vacuum fluctuation, assuming such a zero-energy universe already is nothing. Such a universe would need to be flat, a state which does not contradict current observations that the universe is flat with a 0.5% margin of error.

Some physicists—such as Lawrence Krauss, Stephen Hawking, and Michio Kaku—define or defined "nothing" as an unstable quantum vacuum that contains no particles. Philosopher David Albert has criticised Krauss for this, pointing out that his definition of "nothing" presupposes the existence of quantum fields obeying particular laws of physics. According to Albert, Krauss has "nothing whatsoever to say on the subject of where those fields came from, or of why the world should have consisted of the particular kinds of fields it does, or of why it should have consisted of fields at all, or of why there should have been a world in the first place. Period. Case closed. End of story." Krauss responded that he doesn't "give a damn about what 'nothing' means to philosophers; [he] care[s] about the 'nothing' of reality," and called Albert "a moronic philosopher."

Quantum mechanics proposes that pairs of virtual particles are being created from quantum fluctuations in this "empty" space all the time. If these pairs do not mutually annihilate right away, they could be detected as real particles, for example if one falls into a black hole and its opposite is emitted as Hawking radiation.

Alexander Vilenkin defines "nothing" as "a state with no classical space time."

See also

References

Further reading
 Lucretius. (2007). The Nature of Things. Trans. A. E. Stallings. New York: Penguin Classics.

External links
 Lucretius' De Rerum Natura, translated by William Ellery at the Internet Classics Archive

Philosophical arguments
Philosophy of physics
Physical cosmology